Robert Taylour was an Anglican priest in Ireland in the first half of the eighteenth century.

Taylour was educated at Trinity College, Dublin. He was Archdeacon of Kilmacduagh from 1714 to 1726; and Dean of Clonfert from 1726 until his death in May 1745.

Notes

Alumni of Trinity College Dublin
Archdeacons of Kilmacduagh
Deans of Clonfert
18th-century Irish Anglican priests
1745 deaths